Naryn is a village in Jalal-Abad Region of Kyrgyzstan. It is part of the Aksy District. Its population was 11,306 in 2021. It is situated on the right bank of the river Naryn, adjacent to Kyzyl-Jar and across from Uchqoʻrgʻon (Uzbekistan).

Population

References

Populated places in Jalal-Abad Region